Seán mac Ruaidhri Mac Craith (fl. 14th-century) was an Irish historian known as the author of Caithréim Thoirdhealbhaigh.

Biography

The Meic Craith of Thomond were a learned family who had close ties to Clare Abbey, an Augustinian foundation. They were historians and poets attached to the Uí Bhriain kings and earls of Thomond. Another family of the name, not known to be related, were natives of Termon McGrath, Lough Erne.

Magrath's Caithréim Thoirdhealbhaigh is an account of the wars fought between two branches of the Uí Bhriain kings in the 13th and 14th century, ending with their successful defeat of the Anglo-Normans at the Battle of Dysert O'Dea in 1318, which kept Thomond free of English influence for over two hundred years.

It is also notable for one of the earliest references to the Banshee in Irish literature.

Modern editions of the Caithréim are based on two surviving sources - Royal Irish Academy Ms 23 Q 16, a large fragment on vellum written in 1509; and Trinity College Dublin H. 1. 18 (no. 1292) Ms, written by Aindrias Mac Cruitín for Tadhg Mac Conmara in 1721.

See also

 Mac Craith
 Battle of Dysert O'Dea

External links
 http://www.clarelibrary.ie/eolas/coclare/literature/bardic_poem/bardic_families.htm

References

 "The Normans in Thomond", Thomas Johnson Westropp, Journal of the Royal Society of Antiquaries of Ireland 21 (1890–1891) 284–293, 381–387, 462–472.
 "On the external evidences bearing on the historic character of the 'Wars of Torlough' by John, son of Rory MacGrath", Thomas Johnson Westropp, Transactions of the Royal Irish Academy, C, 32:2 (1902–1904) 133–198.
 Ireland under the Normans (4 vols), Goddard H. Orpen, Oxford, (1911) Vol. 4, 53–106.
 "The wars of Turlogh: an historical document", Edward Curtis, The Irish Review 2 (1912–1913) 577–586, 644–647; 3 (1913–1914) 34–41.
 Sean Mac Ruaidhri Mac Craith, Caithréim Thoirdhealbhaigh: The Triumphs of Turlough, ed. Standish Hayes O'Grady, Irish Texts Society, London, 1929, Vol I & II.
 The preterite passive plural in Caithréim Thoirdhealbhaigh, Vernam E. Hull, Éigse 8 (1955–1957) 30–31.
 "An examination of the medieval Irish text 'Caithréim Thoirdhealbhaigh': the historical value of the 'Caithréim Thoirdhealbhaigh", Leo F. McNamara, North Munster Antiquarian Journal 8 (1958–1961) 182–192.
 "The Caithréim Thoirdhealbhaigh manuscripts and O'Grady's edition", Leo F. McNamara, Modern Philology 59 (1961) 122–125.
 "Traditional motifs in 'Caithréim Thoirdhealbhaigh'", Leo F. McNamara, Kentucky Foreign Languages Quarterly 8 (1961) 85–92.
 A History of the Diocese of Killaloe, Dermot F. Gleeson, H. Gill & Son, Dublin, 1962, p. 453.
 "Dynastic warfare and historical writing in North Munster, 1276–1350", Aoife Nic Ghiollamhaith, Cambridge Medieval Celtic Studies 2 (1981) 73–89.
 "The Charter of Clare Abbey and the Augustinian 'Province' in Co. Clare", Michael MacMahon, The Other Clare, Vol.17, 1993, pp. 21–27.

14th-century Irish historians
Writers from County Clare
Irish-language writers